
Gmina Stolno is a rural gmina (administrative district) in Chełmno County, Kuyavian-Pomeranian Voivodeship, in north-central Poland.

Villages
Gmina Stolno contains the villages and settlements of Cepno, Gorzuchowo, Grubno, Klęczkowo, Kobyły, Łyniec, Małe Czyste, Nałęcz, Obory, Paparzyn, Pilewice, Robakowo, Rybieniec, Sarnowo, Stolno, Trzebiełuch, Wabcz, Wabcz-Kolonia, Wichorze, Wielkie Czyste, Zakrzewo and Zalesie.

Neighbouring gminas
Gmina Stolno is bordered by the town of Chełmno and by the gminas of Chełmno, Grudziądz, Kijewo Królewskie, Lisewo, Papowo Biskupie and Płużnica.

References
Polish official population figures 2006

Stolno
Chełmno County